
Horst von Schroeter (10 June 1919 – 25 July 2006) was a German U-boat commander during World War II. He was a recipient of the Knight's Cross of the Iron Cross of Nazi Germany. After World War II he joined the West German Navy and from 1976 to 1979 held the position of Commander of the NATO Naval forces in the Baltic Sea Approaches (COMNAVBALTAP).

Awards
 Iron Cross (1939) 2nd Class (25 August 1941) & 1st Class (10 February 1942)
 U-boat War Badge (1939) (25 August 1941)
 U-boat Front Clasp in Silver (15 March 1945)

 Knight's Cross of the Iron Cross on 1 June 1944 as Oberleutnant zur See and commander of U-123
 Grand Cross of the Order of Merit of the Federal Republic of Germany (4 September 1971)

References

Citations

Bibliography

 
 
 

1919 births
2006 deaths
U-boat commanders (Kriegsmarine)
Recipients of the Gold German Cross
Recipients of the Knight's Cross of the Iron Cross
People from Meissen (district)
Bundesmarine admirals
Commanders Crosses of the Order of Merit of the Federal Republic of Germany
Vice admirals of the German Navy
Military personnel from Saxony